is a joint-use railway station located in the town of Ogawa, Saitama, Japan, operated jointly by the East Japan Railway Company (JR East) and the private Tōbu Railway Company. The station premises are managed by Tobu Railway.

Lines
It is located 64.1 km from the Tōbu Tōjō Line Ikebukuro terminus.

Station layout

The Tōbu side of the station consists of two island platforms serving four tracks. The JR East side of the station consists of one island platform serving two tracks, forming a passing loop on the single-track Hachikō Line. Two storage tracks lie between the Tobu and JR East platforms.

The Tobu station has a season ticket sales office.

Platforms

History

The Tōbu station opened on 5 November 1923, while what is now the JR station opened on 24 March 1934.

From 17 March 2012, station numbering was introduced on the Tōbu Tōjō Line, with Ogawamachi Station becoming "TJ-33".

Passenger statistics
In fiscal 2019, the Tobu station was used by an average of  9,449 passengers daily. In fiscal 2019, the JR station was used by an average of 599 passengers daily (boarding passengers only).

Surrounding area
Ogawamachi Town Hall
Ogawamachi Post Office
Saitama Prefectural Ogawa High School

See also
 List of railway stations in Japan

References

External links

 JR East station information 
 Tobu station information 

Stations of East Japan Railway Company
Stations of Tobu Railway
Railway stations in Saitama Prefecture
Tobu Tojo Main Line
Hachikō Line
Railway stations in Japan opened in 1923
Ogawa, Saitama